WPOG (710 kHz) is an AM radio station licensed to St. Matthews, South Carolina.  It is owned and operated by Grace Baptist Church of Orangeburg. 
WPOG broadcasts a Christian talk and teaching radio format, along with Southern gospel music.  The station's transmitter is off Radio Road in St. Matthews.  The signal covers the region of South Carolina between Charleston and Columbia.

Because it shares the same frequency as clear-channel station WOR in New York City, WPOG is a daytimer, required to go off the air at night when radio waves travel farther.  The station's programming is heard around the clock on co-owned WWOS-FM 91.9 in St. George, South Carolina.  WPOG is also simulcast on AM 810 WWOS in Walterboro, South Carolina.

History
On August 15, 1975, the station first signed on as WQKI.  It was owned by the Central Carolina Broadcasting Corporation and aired a country music format.

References

External links

POG
POG